Quirino State University, formerly Quirino State College, is a public university in the province of Quirino, Philippines. Its main campus is located in Diffun; other campuses are located in Maddela and Cabarroguis. Nestled in the hills of Diffun, Quirino State University (QSU) is an important center of higher learning in Quirino province.

General Mandate
The state university is mandated to provide higher technological, professional, and vocational instruction and training in science, agricultural and industrial fields, as well as short-term technical and vocational courses. The university promotes research, advanced studies, and progressive leadership in its areas of specialization. Its main campus is located in Diffun.

References

External links
 

State universities and colleges in the Philippines
Universities and colleges in Quirino